The PZL Kania (Polish Kite, also marketed as Kitty Hawk) is a follow-up design to the Mil Mi-2 helicopter, developed  in Poland by PZL-Świdnik.

Design and development
In 1964, an agreement was signed between Poland and the Soviet Union assigning production of the Mil Mi-2 twin-engined light helicopter exclusively to the WSK PZL-Świdnik factory at Świdnik, Poland.

Work on a significantly redesigned version of the Mi-2 started in 1977. PZL decided to develop, in conjunction with the American aero-engine company Allison, a re-engined version for export for western markets, the Kania or Kitty Hawk. The first prototype, utilizing a modified Mi-2 airframe, was flown on 3 June 1979. Two prototypes were made and two pre-series machines. Tests conducted during the early 1980s led to certification according to FAR-29, in February 1986.

The prototype SP-SSC took part in the 5th Helicopter World Championships in Castle Ashby in 1986. Production started that year in limited quantity, in the PZL Świdnik factory. The helicopter was intended to be a replacement of the Mi-2, more economical, comfortable and offering better performance, and it compared quite favourably with Western counterparts. It did not become popular, however, partly due to problems with certification and a weak promotion in Western countries, and reluctance to spend convertible currency for imported parts in Eastern Bloc countries in the 1980s. Only 19 were built until 2006, including prototypes. It isn't currently offered by PZL-Świdnik.

The main user is the Polish Border Guard, with 7 helicopters (not concurrently). The Polish Police used two helicopters. Three Polish Kanias were employed in air service in Sierra Leone in 1987–1990. In 2007, Świdnik offered 6 armed Kanias for Philippine Air Force, but lost in competition (finally, after cancelling a procedure, PZL W-3 Sokół was chosen).

Variants
Passenger Standard
Seats for pilot and 9 passengers, individual vents and lighting.
Passenger Executive
Seats for pilot and 5 passengers, luxury finishing, silenced cockpit, individual vents, lighting and audio system.
Cargo
Medevac / Air ambulance
Equipment and space for up to 4 stretchers or less with paramedic crew on board.
Agricultural
Spitfire Taurus II or Super Kania
American version of the PZL Kania, with redesigned fuselage and single  Allison Model 250-C28 engine, with a big central air inlet, that was to be built under licence in the United States by Spitfire Helicopters but only a mock-up was built.

Operators

Cyprus Air Forces

Border Guard

Air Transport Europe

Specifications

See also

References

1980s Polish military aircraft
1970s Polish helicopters
1980s Polish civil aircraft
Science and technology in Poland
Kania
Twin-turbine helicopters
Aircraft first flown in 1979